Cyprus participated in the Eurovision Song Contest 2015 with the song "One Thing I Should Have Done" written by Mike Connaris and Giannis Karagiannis and performed by Karagiannis. The Cypriot broadcaster Cyprus Broadcasting Corporation (CyBC) returned to the Eurovision Song Contest after a one-year absence following their withdrawal in 2014 due to financial and budget restrictions, and organised the national final Eurovision Song Project in order to select the Cypriot entry for the 2015 contest in Vienna, Austria. The national final featured 54 entries competing in a nine-week-long process, resulting in the selection of Karagiannis with "One Thing I Should Have Done" at the final on 1 February 2015, where six entries remained.

Promotional activities for the entry prior to the contest included performances of the song in both Amsterdam and London. Cyprus was drawn to compete in the second semi-final of the Eurovision Song Contest which took place on 21 May 2015. Performing during the show in position 15, "One Thing I Should Have Done" was announced among the top 10 entries of the second semi-final and therefore qualified to compete in the final on 23 May. It was later revealed that Cyprus placed sixth out of the 17 participating countries in the semi-final with 87 points. In the final, Cyprus performed in position 11 and placed twenty-second out of the 27 participating countries, scoring 11 points.

Background 

Prior to the 2015 contest, Cyprus had participated in the Eurovision Song Contest thirty-one times since their debut in the 1981 contest. Its best placing was fifth, which it achieved three times: in the 1982 competition with the song "Mono i agapi" performed by Anna Vissi, in the 1997 edition with "Mana mou" performed by Hara and Andreas Constantinou, and the 2004 contest with "Stronger Every Minute" performed by Lisa Andreas. Cyprus' least successful result was in the 1986 contest when it placed last with the song "Tora zo" by Elpida, receiving only four points in total. However, its worst finish in terms of points received was when it placed second to last in the 1999 contest with "Tha'nai erotas" by Marlain Angelidou, receiving only two points.

The Cypriot national broadcaster, Cyprus Broadcasting Corporation (CyBC), broadcasts the event within Cyprus and organises the selection process for the nation's entry. In October 2013, CyBC announced their withdrawal from the  citing public opinion regarding the 2012–2013 Cypriot financial crisis and budget restrictions as factors that influenced this decision. Following rumors since late May 2014 that the nation would be returning to the contest, CyBC confirmed their intentions to participate at the 2015 Eurovision Song Contest on 14 July 2014. Cyprus has used various methods to select the Cypriot entry in the past, such as internal selections and televised national finals to choose the performer, song or both to compete at Eurovision. CyBC opted to organise a national final based on the Swedish Eurovision selection Melodifestivalen in order to select the 2015 Cypriot entry with a trailer for the selection being first seen along with their participation confirmation. The national final was originally planned to be a collaboration with music channel MAD TV, however the collaboration was cancelled in October 2014 due to the low amount of submissions received.

Before Eurovision

Eurovision Song Project 
Eurovision Song Project was the national final format developed by CyBC in order to select Cyprus' entry for the Eurovision Song Contest 2015. The competition involved a nine-week-long process that commenced on 7 December 2014 and concluded with the final on 1 February 2015. The shows took place at the CyBC studios in Nicosia, hosted by Antri Karantoni and were broadcast on RIK 1, RIK Sat as well as online via the broadcaster's website cybc.cy. The final was also streamed online at the official Eurovision Song Contest website eurovision.tv.

Format 
The Eurovision Song Project consisted of 54 entries competing over three phases: the auditions between 7 December 2014 and 11 January 2015, the Eurochallenges on 16 and 23 January 2015, and the final on 1 February 2015. The auditions and Eurochallenges were pre-recorded while the final was broadcast live. Each of the six audition shows included three parts: the Eurobox where each artist talked about their life and connection to the contest along with a short a cappella cover of a past Eurovision entry, the Viewing Room where relatives and friends of each artist watched their performance, and the Eurostudio where each artist performed their candidate Eurovision song in front of a judging panel. Only a one minute preview of the audition performances were shown. During the first Eurochallenge, the 20 artists that progressed from the auditions were required to make a stage performance of their songs in full without backing dancers and 10 entries were eliminated. Each of the remaining 10 artists performed two songs during the second Eurochallenge, one being a piano cover of a past Eurovision entry and one being their candidate Eurovision song. Four acts were eliminated, while the remaining six acts progressed to the final. In the final, the winner was selected from the remaining six entries.

The results of the auditions and Eurochallenges were determined by the judging panel, while the results of the final was determined by the 50/50 combination of votes from the judging panel and televoting. The panel consisted of four permanent members that were joined by varying guest international judges during the Eurochallenges and the final. The permanent judges were:

 Despina Olympiou – Cypriot Eurovision representative in 2013
 Alex Panayi – Cypriot Eurovision representative in 1995 and 2000
 Elena Patroklou – Cypriot Eurovision representative in 1991
 Tasos Tryfonos – Actor and media personality

Competing entries 
Artists and composers were able to submit their entries to the broadcaster between 14 July 2014 and 5 September 2014 through an online submission form. All artists were required to have Cypriot nationality or origin and were able to submit a maximum of two entries, while foreign songwriters were allowed to submit songs as long as they collaborated with at least one songwriter of Cypriot nationality or origin. At the conclusion of the deadline, over 100 entries were received by CyBC and included entries from singer Valanto Trifonos, 1993 and 2002 Cypriot Eurovision entrant Dimos Beke, and 2002 Cypriot Eurovision entrant Philipos Konstantinos. The 60 selected entries were announced on 20 October 2014, and among the competing artists was 2008 Cypriot Junior Eurovision entrant Charis Savva. Six of the entries were later withdrawn from the competition as their artists did not attend the auditions.

Auditions 
The six audition shows were aired between 7 December 2014 and 11 January 2015 and featured all 54 entries. Twenty entries received at least three "yes" votes from the four permanent judges and progressed to the Eurochallenge.

Eurochallenges 
The two Eurochallenges shows aired on 16 and 23 January 2015. Each of the twenty remaining artists performed their candidate Eurovision song in the first show and the judging panel selected 10 to progress to the second show. Each of the ten remaining artists performed a piano cover of a past Eurovision entry and their candidate Eurovision song in the second show and the judging panel selected six to progress to the final. The two guest international judges for the Eurochallenges were Christer Björkman (Head of Delegation for Sweden at Eurovision and supervisor of Melodifestivalen) and Dimitris Kontopoulos (Greek producer).

Final 
The final took place on 1 February 2015. The six remaining entries competed and the winner, "One Thing I Should Have Done" performed by Giannis Karagiannis, was selected by a 50/50 combination of votes from the judging panel and a public televote. The two guest international judges for the final were Bruno Berberes (French television director) and Nicola Caligiore (Head of Delegation for Italy at Eurovision). In addition to the performances of the competing entries, the four permanent judges of the competition each performed with two of the finalists. Alex Panayi performed with Doody and Giannis Karagiannis, Elena Patroklou performed with Hovig and Panagiotis Koufogiannis, and Despina Olympiou performed with Nearchos Evangelou and Charis Savva.

Promotion 
John Karayiannis made several appearances across Europe to specifically promote "One Thing I Should Have Done" as the Cypriot Eurovision entry. On 18 April, Karayiannis performed during the Eurovision in Concert event which was held at the Melkweg venue in Amsterdam, Netherlands and hosted by Cornald Maas and Edsilia Rombley. On 26 April, Karayiannis performed during the London Eurovision Party, which was held at the Café de Paris venue in London, United Kingdom and hosted by Nicki French and Paddy O'Connell.

At Eurovision 

The Eurovision Song Contest 2015 took place at Wiener Stadthalle in Vienna, Austria. It consisted of two semi-finals held on 19 and 21 May, respectively, and the final on 23 May 2015. In the 2015 contest, Australia also competed directly in the final as an invited guest nation. The European Broadcasting Union (EBU) split up the competing countries into five different pots based on voting patterns from previous 10 years. On 26 January 2015, an allocation draw was held which placed each country into one of the two semi-finals, as well as which half of the show they would perform in. Cyprus was placed into the second semi-final, to be held on 21 May 2015, and was scheduled to perform in the second half of the show.

Once all the competing songs for the 2015 contest had been released, the running order for the semi-finals was decided by the shows' producers rather than through another draw, so that similar songs were not placed next to each other. All three shows were broadcast in Cyprus on RIK 1, RIK SAT, RIK HD and Trito Programma with commentary by Melina Karageorgiou. Loukas Hamatsos was the Cypriot spokesperson who announched the nation's votes during the final.

Semi-final

John Karayiannis took part in technical rehearsals on 14 and 16 May, followed by dress rehearsals on 20 and 21 May 2015. This included the jury final where professional juries of each country, responsible for 50 percent of each country's vote, watched and voted on the competing entries.

At the start of the song, the arena was plunged into darkness and Karayiannis had a single spotlight shining down from above on him. The initial shots were all in black and white. Karayiannis was dressed very smartly in a black suit and black tie, with him wearing his trademark glasses.
Gradually the light increased and the LED screens showed a star-like background, with the lighting having various hues of blue, purple and orange. Around two minutes into the song, the background exploded into flame-like bursts of light on key moments in the lyrics, especially on the 'I should' line.

At the end of the show, Cyprus was announced as having finished in the top 10 and subsequently qualifying for the final. It was later revealed that Cyprus placed sixth in the semi-final, receiving a total of 87 points.

Final
Shortly after the second semi-final, a winner's press conference was held for the 10 qualifying countries. As part of this press conference, the qualifying artists took part in a draw to determine which half of the final they would subsequently participate in. This draw was done in the order the countries were announced during the semi-final; Cyprus was drawn to compete in the first half. Following this draw, the shows' producers decided upon the running order of the final, as they had done for the semi-finals. Cyprus was subsequently placed to perform in position 11, following the entry from Sweden and before the entry from Australia.

Karayiannis once again took part in dress rehearsals on 22 and 23 May 2015 before the final, including the jury final where the professional juries cast their final votes before the live show. Karayiannis performed a repeat of his semi-final performance during the final on 23 May. At the conclusion of the voting, Cyprus placed 22nd with 11 points.

Voting
Voting during the three shows consisted of 50 percent public televoting and 50 percent from a jury deliberation. The jury consisted of five music industry professionals who were citizens of the country they represent, with their names published before the contest to ensure transparency. This jury was asked to judge each contestant based on: vocal capacity; the stage performance; the song's composition and originality; and the overall impression by the act. In addition, no member of a national jury could be related in any way to any of the competing acts in such a way that they cannot vote impartially and independently. The individual rankings of each jury member were released shortly after the final.

Following the release of the full split voting by the EBU after the conclusion of the competition, it was revealed that Cyprus had placed twenty-third with the public televote and ninth with the jury vote in the final. In the public vote, the country scored 8 points, finishing in 23rd place, while in the jury vote, Cyprus placed ninth with 63 points. In the second semi-final, Cyprus placed eighth with the public televote, receiving 80 points and eighth with the jury vote with 76 points.

Below is a breakdown of points awarded to Cyprus and awarded by the country in the second semi-final and final of the contest, and the breakdown of the jury voting and televoting conducted during the two shows:

Points awarded to Cyprus

Points awarded by Cyprus

Detailed voting results
The Cypriot votes in the second semi-final and the final were based on 50% jury voting and 50% televoting results. The following members comprised the Cypriot jury:
 Andreas Giortsios (jury chairperson)radio producer, news anchorman
 Elias Antoniadeslyricist, general manager
 Gore Meliansinger
 Stella Stylianousinger, teacher
 Argyro Christodoulidoucomposer, lyricist

Notes

References 

2015
Countries in the Eurovision Song Contest 2015
Eurovision